Brez may refer to:

People
 Ethel Brez, American television soap opera writer
 Karina Brez, Miss Florida USA
 Mel Brez, American television soap opera writer

Places
 Brez, Trentino, Italy

Other
 Brez (clothing)

See also